Charles Thomas "Charlie" Schlatter (born May 1, 1966) is an American actor who has appeared in several films and television series. He is best known for his role as Dr. Jesse Travis, the resident student of Dr. Mark Sloan (played by Dick Van Dyke) on the CBS series Diagnosis: Murder. Since the 1990s, he has continued to work mainly as a voice actor, with roles such as the Flash in various media, the titular character on Kick Buttowski: Suburban Daredevil and Wonder-Red in The Wonderful 101.

Early life
Schlatter was born in Englewood, New Jersey. Growing up in Fair Lawn, New Jersey, he got his start in acting at the borough's Memorial Junior High School. He reportedly only auditioned for the school play Oliver! to impress a girl. He received the lead part of Oliver Twist.

Schlatter attended Ithaca College. He later earned a B.F.A. in musical theater. He starred in numerous school plays and became a skilled musician, playing guitar, drums and piano. He also began writing songs.

Career
Schlatter was spotted by a casting director during a performance in 1987 and was asked to audition for Bright Lights, Big City. This led to his first film appearance, as the younger brother of Michael J. Fox.

He starred in 1988's Heartbreak Hotel (directed by Chris Columbus) where his character kidnaps Elvis Presley in an effort to make his mother (Tuesday Weld) happy. His most highly acclaimed role was in the 1988 comedy 18 Again!. His 18-year-old character swaps body and mind with his 81-year-old grandfather, played by George Burns. His work in this film was described as "displaying enormous range and extraordinary skill as an actor in his comedic starring role,"

He also starred in Australian romance film The Delinquents (1989) opposite Kylie Minogue. In 1990, he was cast in the role of Ferris Bueller for NBC's sitcom Ferris Bueller alongside Jennifer Aniston, based on the John Hughes film Ferris Bueller's Day Off. In 1992, he co-starred in Sunset Heat with Michael Paré, Dennis Hopper and Adam Ant. In 1994, he appeared in Police Academy: Mission to Moscow as Cadet Kyle Connors.

In late 1995, Schlatter began his role as Dr. Jesse Travis on the television series Diagnosis: Murder, opposite Dick Van Dyke, who was impressed with his performance. His character was introduced as a comic relief character in the third season after Scott Baio's character moved to Colorado and never returned. He remained on the show for the next six seasons until the series was cancelled in 2001. During the series, he also wrote the episode "A Resting Place." After the series' ending, he and Van Dyke remain close friends, who continues to visit him, Schlatter's wife Colleen and their three children. He was also one of the participants at his acting mentor's 90th Birthday Party on December 13, 2015 at Disneyland in Anaheim, California. He said in a 2017 interview on Acast.com, if he is still friends with the then 91-year-old Van Dyke: "Yeah, I know! I probably owe him a call or he probably owes me a call ... I don't know! It's been a little while. No, he's the best!" 

In early 2007, he appeared in the films Out at the Wedding and Resurrection Mary.

In 2014, he appeared as a guest star on the NCIS season 11 episode "Shooter," playing Lorne Davis. In 2015, he became the narrator for truTV's video clip series Top Funniest starting in the third season.

Animation
Since the early 1990s, Schlatter would begin voicing characters in many series. Among his roles were The Flash on Superman: The Animated Series, The Flash on The Batman and Batman Unlimited: Animal Instincts, the titular characters in the pilot of Jimmy Two-Shoes, Ace Bunny in Loonatics Unleashed and Kick Buttowski: Suburban Daredevil, Kevin Levin on Ben 10 (not to be confused with Greg Cipes's portrayal in future variations), Hawk on A.T.O.M., Tommy Cadle on Pet Alien, Chris Kirkman on Random! Cartoons (a character he would later voice in the pilot of Bravest Warriors), Cameron on Bratz and Doctor Mindbender, Wild Bill and Lift-Ticket on G.I. Joe: Renegades.

Schlatter was originally cast for the role of Philip J. Fry on Futurama, but Billy West got the role due to a casting change.

He also voiced Timmy in the Nickelodeon version of Winx Club and various characters on The Loud House.

Video games
Schlatter was the voice of Major Raikov in Metal Gear Solid 3: Snake Eater as well as Raiden in the short film Metal Gear Raiden: Snake Eraser included on the second disk of the Metal Gear Solid 3: Subsistence game. He voiced Specter, the villain in the game Ape Escape 3. In 2012, he also voiced Finn in the game Sorcery.

In 2004, he voiced Aatius Vedrix, Lucius Vulso, Tarakh, Steward Daedakovoon, Znink Flatzazzle and Dunn Coldbrow in EverQuest II. He recently voiced Robin and reprised his role as The Flash in Lego Batman 2: DC Super Heroes, Lego Batman: The Movie – DC Super Heroes Unite, Lego Batman 3: Beyond Gotham and Lego Dimensions. He also voiced the main protagonist Wonder-Red in The Wonderful 101.

Personal life
Schlatter dated Jennifer Aniston in 1990, during the shooting of the Ferris Bueller television series. He married Colleen Gunderson in 1994 and they have two daughters and a son.

Filmography

Live-action

Film

Television

Voice acting

Film

Television

Video games

References

External links
 
 
 Charlie Schlatter Unplugged! (at archive.org because GeoCities shut down)

1966 births
Living people
American male film actors
American male television actors
American male video game actors
American male voice actors
Ithaca College alumni
Male actors from New Jersey
People from Englewood, New Jersey
People from Fair Lawn, New Jersey
20th-century American male actors
21st-century American male actors